I Love You, Paris is a 1992 live album by Shirley Horn, recorded at the Théâtre du Châtelet in Paris.

Reception 

The Allmusic review by Richard S. Ginell stated: "Horn is in peak form throughout this program, often sounding exquisite and using silence and pauses quite expertly...Highly recommended".

I Love You, Paris was nominated for Best Jazz Vocal Performance in the 37th Annual Grammy Awards.

Track listing 
 "Wouldn't It Be Loverly" (Alan Jay Lerner, Frederick Loewe) – 6:23
 "Just in Time" (Jule Styne, Betty Comden, Adolph Green) – 3:13
 "He Was Too Good to Me" (Lorenz Hart, Richard Rodgers) – 4:51
 "Do It Again" (Buddy DeSylva, George Gershwin) – 8:17
 "Old Country" (Curtis Reginald Lewis, Nat Adderley) – 5:37
 "It's Easy to Remember (And So Hard to Forget)" (Hart, Rodgers) – 6:39
 "All Through the Night" (Cole Porter) – 2:32
 "L.A. Breakdown" (Larry B. Marks) – 6:47
 "I Loves You Porgy / Here Comes de Honey Man" (G. Gershwin, I. Gershwin, DuBose Heyward) – 9:45
 "A Song for You / Goodbye" (Leon Russell)/(Gordon Jenkins) – 12:54
 "That Old Devil Called Love" (Doris Fisher, Allan Roberts) – 7:33

Personnel 
Musicians
 Shirley Horn – piano, vocals
Charles Ables – bass guitar
Steve Williams – drums, percussion

Production
 Shirley Horn – producer
Jean-Philippe Allard – recording coordinator
Margery Greenspan – art direction, artwork
Pier Alessandri – assistant engineer
Suzanne Dyer
Richard Parsons
Rene Weis
Sheila Mathis – associate producer
Alain Cluzeau – engineer
Richard Seidel – executive producer
Daniel Vong – illustrations
Joel E. Siegel – liner notes, producer
Dan Kincaid – mastering
Dave Baker – mixing
Alexis Gargarino – photography
Nate Herr – product manager

References 

1994 live albums
Shirley Horn live albums
Verve Records live albums